Insanity (literally translated "The Feuding") is a 2019 Finnish found footage horror film written and directed by Miska Kajanus. The film tells the story of how friendships are sorely tested over a weekend spent on an enigmatic getaway trip. The film's actors include Alina Tomnikov, Hanna Angelvuo, Karlo Haapiainen, Saara Inari and Henry Pöyhiä.

The film  had its world premiere in the United States at the Marina del Rey Film Festival on October 20, 2019. It had its theatrical premiere in Finland on February 14, 2020.

A sequel is being planned for the film, which will be filmed in the United States.

Premise 
A group of friends head to an island for a getaway, class reunion, and a night of partying. During the fateful evening, the past begins to haunt them and old grudges from their shared past come to the surface. As the night turns awry, they start to fear there might also be something else on the island besides them. During one bloody night, old scores are settled, everything is brought to the surface, and revenge is undertaken.

Cast 
 Alina Tomnikov as Vivi
 Hanna Angelvuo as Sanni
 Karlo Haapiainen as Leo
 Saara Inari as Jane
 Elsa Sulavuori as young Jane
 Henry Pöyhiä as Tomi
 Anna Sulavuori as Elli
 Ilona Chevakova as Jane's mother

References

External links 

Insanity at Black Lion Pictures (in Finnish)
Insanity at Miskakajanus.fi

Finnish horror films
2019 horror films
Found footage films
2019 directorial debut films
2010s Finnish-language films